Yusuf Abdioğlu (born 14 October 1989) is a Turkish professional footballer who plays as a defender for TFF First League club Samsunspor.

Professional career
Abdioğlu spent most of his early career in semi-pro in Turkey, starting with Lüleburgazspor. He had stints at Ofspor, Nazilli Belediyespor, Altınordu, and Ankaragücü before moving to Hatayspor in 2018. He helped them get promoted into the Süper Lig for the first time in their history in 2020. Abdioğlu made his professional debut with Hatayspor in a 2-0 Süper Lig win over defending champions İstanbul Başakşehir F.K. on 14 September 2020, at the age of 31.

On 21 June 2022, Abdioğlu signed a two-year contract with Samsunspor.

References

External links
 
 

1989 births
People from Of, Turkey
Living people
Turkish footballers
Association football defenders
Ofspor footballers
Nazilli Belediyespor footballers
Altınordu F.K. players
MKE Ankaragücü footballers
Hatayspor footballers
Samsunspor footballers
Süper Lig players
TFF First League players
TFF Second League players
TFF Third League players